Warrington railway station may refer to one of two stations in Warrington, Cheshire, England:

Warrington Bank Quay railway station, on the West Coast Main Line
Warrington Central railway station, on the Liverpool to Manchester line